Down at the Khyber is the first album that Joel Plaskett recorded with his backing band The Emergency. The title was influenced by the many days and nights spent playing and recording at The Khyber.

Down at the Khyber was named the 46th greatest Canadian album of all time by Bob Mersereau in his book The Top 100 Canadian Albums.

Track listing
All songs written by Joel Plaskett except where noted.
 "Down at the Khyber"
 "There's Love in the Air"
 "Maybe We Should Just Go Home"
 "Clueless Wonder"
 "This Is a Message"
 "Unconditional Love"
 "Waiting to Be Discovered"
 "True Patriot Love"
 "Blinding Light"
 "It's Catchin' On"
 "Cry Together" (Alton Ellis & Coxsone Dodd)
 "Light of the Moon"

Album credits

Personnel 
Joel Plaskett: vocals, guitars, pedal steel, mandolin, keyboards
Tim Brennan: bass, backing vocals, piano
Dave Marsh: drums, backing vocals, percussion, organ

With
Ruth Minnikin: vocals on Track 9
Ian McGettigan: acoustic guitar on Track 12, tambourine and backing vocals on Track 9
Charles Austin: bouzouki on Track 12
Bill Plaskett: banjo on Track 12
Valerie Salez: backing vocals on Track 12

Production 
Produced by Joel Plaskett with Ian McGettigan
Recorded by Ian McGettigan at Ultramagnetic Recording, Halifax, Nova Scotia (Oct/Nov 2000)
Technical assistance by Charles Austin and Kenny Lewis
Mastered by Brett Zilaki at Metalworks Studios, Mississauga, Ontario

2001 albums
Joel Plaskett albums